¡Viva Zapata! is the second album by the American punk band 7 Year Bitch. It was released June 28, 1994, on Seattle-based C/Z Records. It was their first record to feature new guitarist Roisin Dunne who had replaced Stefanie Sargent in 1992. The album's title is in tribute to The Gits' vocalist, and friend of the group, Mia Zapata, who was raped and strangled to death in July 1993. Some of the songs on this album relate to Zapata's murder directly (such as "M.I.A.", which encourages vigilante justice for her killer) as well as Sargent's death by drug overdose ("Rock A Bye").

Track listing

Personnel 
 Selene Vigil – vocals
 Roisin Dunne – guitar
 Elizabeth Davis – bass
 Valerie Agnew – drums

References 

1994 albums
7 Year Bitch albums
C/Z Records albums
Albums produced by Jack Endino